The Czech Republic football league system is a series of interconnected leagues for club football in the Czech Republic.

The system

2013–14
Below shows how the current system works. For each division, its English name, official name or sponsorship name (which often differs radically from its official name) and number of clubs is given. Each division promotes to the division(s) that lie directly above them and relegates to the division(s) that lie directly below them.

Two clubs are relegated and promoted from the Czech First League and Czech 2. Liga respectively each season. 

One club is promoted from both the ČFL and the MSFL to replace the two relegated teams from Czech 2. Liga.

Winners of Czech Divisions A, B and C are promoted to the ČFL and winners of Czech Divisions D and E are promoted to the MFSL. Depending on the regional locations of the teams relegated from Czech 2. Liga the number of teams  promoted and relegated from the ČFL and MFSL can vary from season to season.

Below the five 4th Divisions, there are 14 regional divisions, the winners of which are promoted to the corresponding 4th division. Promotion from 5th to 4th level not necessarily follows the path in the table below (this is mainly the case of Central Bohemian region), teams are placed to particular divisions according to their location/FA decision. Clubs from Bohemia (regions below Divisions A/B/C) can't play with clubs from Moravia-Silesia (Divisions D/E) though.

See also
Regions of the Czech Republic
Districts of the Czech Republic

Cup competitions

Clubs at the top four levels are eligible for cup competitions.

Czech Cup (MOL Cup)
Czech Supercup (Community Shield)

External links
 Official Czech FA website
  League321.com – Czech Republic football league tables, records & statistics database.
Czech Republic football league ratest scores, scheduled (flashscore)

Czech Republic